Tibetans in Burma are a relatively unknown and unreached Tibetan population outside of Tibet. They are concentrated primarily in the northernmost village in Burma, Tahaundam. As early into the twentieth century as 1932, Tibetans, along with Chinese traders, conducted raids into the northernmost regions of Burma, often displacing the Derung pygmies who resided there. As recently as 2003, Tibetan Khampa traders still cross the border into Burma to conduct business".

In 2002-2003, P. Christiaan Klieger, anthropologist from California Academy of Sciences, and photographer Dong Lin retraced their previous steps, and succeeded in making the first anthropological survey of the Hkakabo Razi region.  On foot they reached Tahaundam, which is inhabited by about 200 Khampa Tibetans, including mountaineer Nyima Gyaltsen (see below).

See also
 Tibet
 Tibetan people
 Kham
 Ethnic groups in Myanmar

References

Ethnic groups in Myanmar
 
Buddhist communities of Myanmar